Anthony J. Kehl (born October 21, 1942) is an American football coach.  He served as the head football coach at Sonoma State University from 1982 to 1986, compiling a record of 12–40.

Head coaching record

College

References

1942 births
Living people
American football linebackers
American football offensive guards
Humboldt State Lumberjacks football players
Minnesota Golden Gophers football players
Nevada Wolf Pack football coaches
Sonoma State Cossacks football coaches
High school football coaches in California
Sportspeople from Eureka, California
Coaches of American football from California
Players of American football from California